The super middleweight (or light cruiserweight) division in MMA sits between the middleweight division and the light heavyweight division. It was approved by the Association of Boxing Commissions on July 26, 2017.

References

Mixed martial arts weight classes